Akhilesh Gavde (born 27 July 1987) is a Caymanian cricketer. In August 2019, he was named in the Cayman Islands cricket team's Twenty20 International (T20I) squad for the Regional Finals of the 2018–19 ICC T20 World Cup Americas Qualifier tournament. He made his T20I debut for the Cayman Islands against the United States on 19 August 2019.

References

External links
 

1987 births
Living people
Caymanian cricketers
Cayman Islands Twenty20 International cricketers
Place of birth missing (living people)